The Windsor Board of Education (WBOE) was a school district in Windsor, Ontario, Canada.

The district, prior to its closure, had 32 elementary schools, eight secondary schools, and 7 agency schools. In 1998 it was amalgamated with the Essex County Board of Education into the Greater Essex County District School Board.

Schools
Elementary:

Bellewood
Central
Concord (merger of Prince Charles & John McCrae in 1987)
Coronation
David Maxwell
Dougall Avenue
Eastwood
Forest Glade
Frank Begley
General Brock
Glenwood
Gordon McGregor
H.D. Taylor
Hetherington
Hugh Beaton
J.E. Benson
John Campbell
John McWilliam
King Edward
Marlborough
Maryvale
Northwood
Oakwood
Parkview
Percy P. McCallum
Prince Edward
Prince of Wales
Princess Anne
Princess Elizabeth
Queen Victoria
Roseland
Roseville
Southwood
W.G. Davis

Secondary:
Century Secondary School
J.L. Forster Secondary School
Honourable W.C. Kennedy Collegiate
W. D. Lowe High School 
Vincent Massey Secondary School
Riverside Secondary School
Walkerville Collegiate Institute

Closed prior to dissolution:
 Centennial Secondary School

References

External links

Windsor Board Of Education

Former school districts in Ontario
Education in Windsor, Ontario